The Motorola Droid Xyboard, previously released as the Xoom 2 in Europe before being renamed, is an Android-based tablet computer by Motorola Mobility, announced by Motorola on November 3, 2011.

The device is available in 3G and Wi-Fi variants with there being options between an 8.2-inch screen or a 10.1-inch screen model.

There is an optional active capacitive stylus available, sold separately.

Media Edition 
The Droid Xyboard is also available as a Media Edition.  The Motorola website states that the Media Edition will "Stream files from your PC" with "MotoCast™" and has an 8.2-inch "HD widescreen" with "Adaptive virtual surround sound". The Media Edition does not support the active stylus.

Availability

UK
Both Xoom 2 tablets were released in November 2011, and are available in the UK at Carphone Warehouse, Best Buy, Dixons, PC World and Currys in the United Kingdom.

North America
The Droid Xyboard was released in some stores on December 9, and was released in all stores on December 12, 2011.

See also
 Comparison of tablet computers
 Droid RAZR
 Android version history

References

External links
 

Android (operating system) devices
Tablet computers
Tablet computers introduced in 2011
Motorola products